Tanya Bingert (born March 13, 1970 in Richmond, British Columbia) is a Canadian former competitive figure skater who competed in ladies' singles. She won the bronze medal at the Canadian Figure Skating Championships in 1991 and 1992. She was also a junior national champion and an alternate for the Canadian Olympic team. After the end of her career as a competitor, she became a skating coach in British Columbia.

Results

References

1970 births
Canadian female single skaters
Living people